Marianna Tabain (born 19 October 1992) is an Australian professional footballer who last played for Australian W-League team Perth Glory.

Personal life
Tabain was born in Sydney, New South Wales. Tabain's family derives from the island of Korčula, Croatia.

Club career

Cockburn City
Tabain started her junior playing career at Cockburn City in Spearwood.

Western Knights
In 2005, Tabain moved from Cockburn City to play for Croatian club Western Knights, in Mosman Park. After a few seasons at Western Knights, Tabain was identified to be a part of the Football West National Training Centre, the Western Australian State Team and the Western Australian Institute of Sport program before moving to Perth Glory.

Perth Glory, 2008–2014
Tabain debuted for Perth Glory at the age of 15 in the inaugural season of the Australian Westfield W-League. Tabain won the 2009 W-League Goal of the Year Award for a goal in Round 9 against Adelaide United.

On the 15th of November 2014, Perth Glory became Minor Premiers at Ashfield Reserve. Tabain spent eight seasons at Perth Glory before moving to play for Melbourne City. During her time at Perth, Tabain was nominated for W-League Goal of the Year Award on numerous occasions. Tabain also took out the Golden Boot award for Perth in 2009.

Melbourne City, 2015–2017
Marianna Tabain represented Melbourne City in The Australian Westfield W-League. Founded in 2015, the club became W-League Premiers in 2015–16 and W-League Champions in 2015–16 and 2016–17. Tabain played an integral part in the teams immediate success. During her second season at Melbourne City, Tabain made her 100th W-League appearance against Melbourne Victory at Epping Stadium on 15 January 2017. She was the second player in the W-League to reach the 100 game milestone.

Return to Perth Glory
In August 2017, Tabain returned to Perth Glory.

ŽNK Split
Tabain played for Croatian League and Cup Champions ŽNK Split, and represented the club in the UEFA Women's Champions League qualifiers in Ukraine in August 2019.

Second return to Perth Glory
In December 2020, Tabain returned to the Australian W-League, signing once again with Perth Glory. Tabain departed Perth Glory ahead of the 2021–22 A-League Women season.

International career
Tabain has represented The Australian National team at U/17 and U/20 level in Europe and Asia.

Honours and awards

Perth Glory FC

• Goal of the year: 2009

• Golden Boot award: 2009

• W-League Premiership: 2014

• W-League Grand finalist: 2017

Melbourne City FC

• W-League Championship: 2015–16, 2016–17, 2017–18

• W-League Premiership: 2015–16

ŽNK Split

• Appearances in UEFA Women's Champions League

W-league

• Over 100 games in the W-League

Professional Footballers Australia 

• W-League Team of The Decade (2010–2020)

References

External links
 Melbourne City player profile

Australian women's soccer players
Living people
Perth Glory FC (A-League Women) players
Melbourne City FC (A-League Women) players
ŽNK Split players
1992 births
Women's association football midfielders
Women's association football forwards